Sohoman is the sixty-fifth release and tenth live album by Tangerine Dream. Remixed and released in 1999, it is sourced from the first set of the 22 February 1982 concert at the Regent Theatre in Sydney Australia. When compared to fan recordings, Sohoman was heavily edited in the studio.  It is the first in the Tangerine Dream Classics Edition series, preceding Soundmill Navigator and Antique Dreams.

Track listing

Other releases
Leprous Appearance On Wednesday is a bootleg LP released in 1984 that contains the same part of the concert as Sohoman. This bootleg was re-released in 1993 as a CD titled Dreaming. The fan release Tangerine Tree Volume 37: Sydney 1982 was released in 2003 and consists of the complete concert recorded from a radio broadcast.

References

1999 live albums
Tangerine Dream live albums